Giancarlo Cito (born 12 August 1945) is an Italian politician and entrepreneur, former mayor of Taranto.

Biography 
In 1985, Cito founded the local TV station Antenna Taranto 6 (AT6); his channel gets great success and Cito becomes very popular in his city also because, intercepting the dissatisfaction with the bankruptcy management of the city administration lead by the Christian Democracy and the Socialist Party in the early 1990s, he created a political column in which he denounced the offenses committed by local administrators. In 1997 some of his family members bought the historic Lucanian broadcaster Tele Basilicata Matera, whose operational headquarters were soon transferred to Taranto. Between 2003 and 2007, during his detention to serve the sentence for external competition in association with organized crime, he graduated in Legal Sciences.

In the 1970s, Cito joined the Italian Social Movement, from which he has been expelled because of his extremism. In 1992, Cito founded his own party: AT6 - Southern Action League, a far-right meridionalist party.

Cito candidates for mayor of Taranto in the municipal elections of 1993, winning the run-off against the progressive candidate Gaetano Minervini, often insulted by Cito during the electoral campaign through his television channel. In 1996, Cito leaves the office of mayor in order to candidate for the Chamber of Deputies during the 1996 general elections, managing to gain a seat in Parliament.

In 1997 he became a provocative candidate for the office of mayor of Milan, contrasting his unbridled meridionalism to the northern tendencies of the Lega Nord, while in 2000 he candidates for the role of president of Apulia during the 2000 regional elections.

In 1997 Cito was accused of collusion with the Sacra Corona Unita: he was found guilty in 2002 and imprisoned between 2003 and 2007. During the years in jail, Cito managed to graduate in Legal Sciences. In May 2004 he tried to commit suicide by cutting his wrists veins; however, he was rescued and saved in time.

In 2007, due to the accusation of collusion with organizated crime, unable to candidate again as mayor, he candidates his son Mario, who became the party candidate for the role of mayor of Taranto during the elections of 2007, 2012 and 2017.

References 

1945 births
Living people
People from Taranto
Italian Social Movement politicians
Politicians of Apulia
20th-century Italian politicians
21st-century Italian politicians
Mayors of Taranto